Pierluigi Pinto (born 22 September 1998) is an Italian football player. He plays as a defender for  club Carrarese.

Career

Fiorentina 
Born in Brindisi, Pinto was a youth exponent of Fiorentina.

Loan to Arezzo 
On 13 July 2018, Pinto and Luca Mosti were loaned to Serie C club Arezzo on a season-long loan deal. On 16 September he made his professional debut, in Serie C, for Arezzo in a 1–0 away win over Lucchese, he played the entire match. He became Arezzo's first-choice early in the season. From September 2018 to March 2019 he played 29 consecutive entire matches until he was replaced by Lorenzo Burzigotti in the 57th minute of a 3–0 away defeat against Carrarese. Pinto ended his season-long to Arezzo with 37 appearances, including 36 as a starter, and he helped the club to reach the qurter-finals of the play-off, however the lost 4–2 on aggregate against Pisa.

Loan to Salernitana and Bari 
On 29 August 2019, Pinto joined Serie B club Salernitana on loan with an option to purchase. Three months later, on 2 November, Pinto made his debut for the club and in Serie B as a starter in a 2–1 home win over Virtus Entella, he was replaced by Paweł Jaroszyński after 85 minutes. Four weeks later, on 30 November, he played his first entire match for the club, a 1–1 home draw against Ascoli. In January 2020, his loan was terminated and he returned to Fiorentina leaving Salernitana with only 4 appearances, but all as a starter, remaining an unused substitute for 13 other matches during the loan.

On 31 January 2020, Pinto was loaned to Serie C club Bari. However he remained always an unused substitute without playing any match for the club.

Teramo
He did not play in the 2020–21 season and his contract with Fiorentina ended at the end of the season.

On 12 November 2021, he signed with Serie C club Teramo.

Carrarese
On 11 July 2022, Pinto signed a two-year contract with Carrarese.

Career statistics

Club

References

External links 
 

1998 births
Living people
People from Brindisi
Footballers from Apulia
Italian footballers
Association football defenders
Serie B players
Serie C players
ACF Fiorentina players
S.S. Arezzo players
U.S. Salernitana 1919 players
S.S.C. Bari players
S.S. Teramo Calcio players
Carrarese Calcio players
Sportspeople from the Province of Brindisi